Czech Sign Language is the sign language of the deaf community in the Czech Republic. It presumably emerged around the time of the first deaf school in Bohemia (1786). It belongs to the French sign-language family and is partially intelligible with French sign language. Despite the similarity of oral Czech and Slovak, it is not particularly close to Slovak Sign Language.

References

French Sign Language family
Languages of the Czech Republic